Sahray-e Bugal (also Romanized as Şaḩrāy-e Būgāl) is a village in Howmeh Rural District, in the Central District of Larestan County, Fars Province, Iran. At the 2006 census, its population was 9, in 6 families.

References 

Populated places in Larestan County